HMS C24 was one of 38 C-class submarines built for the Royal Navy in the first decade of the 20th century. The boat survived the First World War and was sold for scrap in 1921.

Design and description
The C-class boats of the 1907–08 and subsequent Naval Programmes were modified to improve their speed, both above and below the surface. They displaced  on the surface and  submerged. The C-class submarines had a crew of two officers and fourteen ratings.

For surface running, the boats were powered by a single 12-cylinder  Vickers petrol engine that drove one propeller shaft. When submerged the propeller was driven by a  electric motor. They could reach  on the surface and  underwater.

The boats were armed with two 18-inch (45 cm) torpedo tubes in the bow. They could carry a pair of reload torpedoes, but generally did not as they would have to remove an equal weight of fuel in compensation.

Construction and career
HMS C24 was built by Vickers, Barrow. She was laid down on 12 February 1908 and was commissioned on 5 May 1909. The boat was used in the first successful U-boat trap. The tactic was to use a decoy trawler to tow a submarine. When a U-boat was sighted, the tow line and communication line was slipped and the submarine would attack the U-boat. Operating with the trawler Taranaki, C24 sank  in the North Sea off Eyemouth on 23 June 1915. The tactic was partly successful, but later was abandoned after the loss of two C-class submarines, in both cases with the loss of their entire crews.

HMS C24 was sold on 29 May 1921 in Sunderland.

Notes

References

External links 
 MaritimeQuest HMS C24 pages

 

Ships built in Barrow-in-Furness
British C-class submarines
Royal Navy ship names
1908 ships